The 2023 Rose Bowl was a college football bowl game played on January 2, 2023, at the Rose Bowl in Pasadena, California. The 109th annual Rose Bowl, the game featured Penn State from the Big Ten Conference and Utah from the Pac-12 Conference. The game began at 2:11p.m. PST and was aired on ESPN and ESPN Radio. It was one of the 2022–23 bowl games concluding the 2022 FBS football season. Sponsored by Prudential Financial, the game is officially known as the Rose Bowl Game presented by Prudential.

Induction ceremonies to the Rose Bowl Hall of Fame were held before the game honoring three-time Rose Bowl Game head coach Hugo Bezdek (1884–1952), recently retired Rose Bowl Stadium CEO Darryl Dunn, 1977 Rose Bowl Game MVP Vince Evans (USC), and 1987 All-American Lorenzo White (Michigan State).

Teams
Based on conference tie-ins, the game featured Big Ten Conference team Penn State and Pac-12 Conference champion Utah. Utah earned their spot by defeating #4 USC in the Pac-12 Championship by a score of 47–24 on December 2. Penn State earned their spot after Ohio State and Michigan made it to the College Football Playoff. This was Utah's second consecutive Rose Bowl, with an appearance in last year's edition against the Ohio State Buckeyes, while this was be Penn State's 5th overall Rose Bowl game, most recently playing in the 2017 edition against the USC Trojans.

This game marked the Nittany Lions' 100th anniversary of their first Rose Bowl Game. They were defeated by Southern California 14–3 on January 1, 1923. This was the first time Utah and Penn State had ever played each other.

Penn State Nittany Lions

The Nittany Lions earned their 5th overall Rose Bowl bid after they finished the regular season as the 3rd highest ranked team from the Big Ten Conference.  The two higher ranked teams in the Big Ten, Michigan and Ohio State, both reached the College Football Playoff, giving the Nittany Lions the trip to Pasadena.  Penn State finished their regular season with an overall 10–2 record, 7–2 in Big Ten play.  Their losses came to Michigan and Ohio State in the 7th and 9th weeks of the regular season, respectively.

Utah Utes

After winning their second-straight Pac-12 championship, this was the second consecutive Rose Bowl appearance for the Utes, who lost to Ohio State in the 2022 edition. Utah finished their regular season with a 9–3 overall record, 7–2 in Pac-12 play. Their losses came  to Florida, UCLA (in the same stadium), and Oregon.  The Utes faced USC in the Pac-12 Championship, a rematch between the teams.  Utah had defeated USC on October 15 by a 43–42 score (USC's only regular season loss), and defeated them again for the Pac-12 title, 47–24. The Utes entered the Rose Bowl with an overall 10–3 record.

Game summary

Statistics

References

Rose Bowl
Rose Bowl Game
Rose Bowl
Rose Bowl
Penn State Nittany Lions football bowl games
Utah Utes football bowl games